Oku-iwa Rock is a substantial rock exposure just east of Oku-iwa Glacier on the coast of Queen Maud Land. Mapped from surveys and air photos by Japanese Antarctic Research Expedition (JARE), 1957–62, and named Oku-iwa (interior rock). The name presumably suggests the interior position of the rock with respect to the minor recession of the coast along which the rock is located.

Rock formations of Queen Maud Land
Prince Olav Coast